Blaine High School may refer to:

 Blaine High School (Minnesota), United States
 Blaine High School (Washington), United States